Ntando Menzi Mncube (born 4 November 1986), is a South African actor, singer and dancer. He is best known for the roles in the television serials such as; Umlilo, Lockdown, Side Dish and Durban Gen.

Personal life
Mncube was born on 4 November 1986 in Ulundi, North of KwaZulu-Natal, South Africa in a family with four siblings. He graduated with a National Diploma in Drama & Production studies from the Durban University of Technology (DUT) in 2008. His two younger brothers Wiseman Mncube and Omega are also popular actors. Wiseman appeared in the serials such as; Uzalo, Gold Diggers, and EHostela, whereas Omega played the popular role "Phelelani" on Uzalo.
He is a father of two children.

Career
During and after his life in DUT, he performed in many theatre productions, such as Man of La Mancha, Jimbo and Spice 'n Stuff, No Tears, Let My People Go and Animal Farm, Peter Pan and Robin Hood.

In 2013, he made television debut with the SABC1 drama series Intersexions by playing the role of "Suave Guy". After that, he made a guest starring role "Viro" in the e.tv drama anthology serial eKasi: Our Stories aired in 2014. In the same year, he got the opportunity to appear in the Mzansi Magic serial Saints and Sinners with the role "MUC 1" and in the SABC1 drama Kowethu with he role "Mr Mahlangu". In December 2015, he joined with the M-Net film The Ring which was produced for 2015 Magic in Motion Academy interns. Then in 2016, he joined with third season of the e.tv family drama series Umlilo ad played the role "Thulane".

In 2017, Ntando played the role "Senzo" in the Mzansi Magic prison drama Lockdown. and then recurring role in the second season of the serial in late 2017. After that success, he joined with the third season of the SABC2 sitcom Abo Mzala in 2018 for the role "Bonginkosi". In that year, he made his first television lead role in the SABC1 miniseries Side Dish, where he played the role of "Apollo". In 2019, he appeared in the Mzansi Magic period drama Ifalakhe with the role of "Bhekile". Then in 2020, he joined with the recurring cast of e.tv. medical drama series Durban Gen for the role "Sibusiso Dlamini".

Filmography

2022  The wife           bafo.              Drama

References

1986 births
Living people
South African male film actors
South African male television actors
South African male stage actors